The following highways in Virginia have been known as State Route 258:
 State Route 258 (Virginia 1933-1940), Grove Hill to Alma
 State Route 258, 1940 – mid-1940s, now part of U.S. Route 258
 U.S. Route 258, 1940–present